Constitutional liberalism is a form of government that upholds the principles of classical liberalism and the rule of law. It differs from liberal democracy in that it is not about the method of selecting government.

The journalist and scholar Fareed Zakaria explains that constitutional liberalism "is about government's goals. It refers to the tradition, deep in Western history, that seeks to protect an individual's autonomy and dignity against coercion, whatever the source—state, church, or society". In a constitutionally liberal state, a liberal market is regulated and protected at the level of the constitution and so trade is mostly free, but not entirely unhampered.

Throughout history, democracy is becoming more common around the world, but it has been in decline for the last 13 years. Freedom House reported that in 2018 there were 116 electoral democracies. Many of these countries are not constitutionally liberal and can be described as illiberal democracies. Constitutional liberalism is different from liberal constitutionalism. While the former asserts values of personal sovereignty at a constitutional level, the latter guards freedom to assert ones own values in the constitution.

See also 
 Classical liberalism
 Constitutionalism
 Democratic ideals
 History of democracy
 Illiberal democracy
 Liberal democracy
 Night-watchman state
 Social liberalism
 Totalitarianism

References

Further reading 
 Zakaria, Fareed (2007). The Future of Freedom: Illiberal Democracy at Home and Abroad (Revised Edition).  W.W. Norton and Company.  .

Democracy
Elections
Liberalism

Political systems